Relax may refer to:

Aviation
 Roland Z-120 Relax, a German ultralight aircraft design for the 120 kg class

Music

Albums
 Relax (Blank & Jones album), 2003
 Relax (Das Racist album), 2011

Songs
 "Relax" (song), a 1983 song by Frankie Goes to Hollywood, covered, sampled and remixed by many artists
 "Relax", a song by Das Racist, title track from Relax 
 "Relax", a song by Deetah from Deadly Cha Cha
 "Relax", a song by Labi Siffre from The Singer and the Song
 "Relax", a song by Peaches from I Feel Cream
 "Relax", a song by Superorganism from Superorganism
 "Relax", a song by The Who from The Who Sell Out
 "Relax, Take It Easy", a 2006 song by Mika

Film
 Relax (film), a Telugu film
 Relax...It's Just Sex, a 1998 film

Computing
 Regular Language description for XML, a specification for describing XML-based languages

See also 
Leisure
Relaxation (disambiguation)